AM 1316-241 is a pair of overlapping galaxies in the constellation Hydra. It is notable for having recently been discovered to have revealed visible dust by the back light from the more distant galaxy of the two. 

It is believed the pair are interacting.

References

External links 

University of Alabama Astronomy 
THE ASTRONOMICAL JOURNAL, 121:1442-1455, 2001 March 
NASA Extragalactic Database 
The Astrophysical Journal, December 10, 2000 
Annual Review of Astronomy and Astrophysics, September 2003 
Space.com

See also
 2MASX J00482185-2507365 occulting pair - a similar pair

Overlapping galaxies
Interacting galaxies
46461
Hydra (constellation)